Laurel Christian School is a private, college preparatory Christian school founded in 1982. It is located in Laurel, Mississippi, in the United States.

Sports 
In 2020 and 2021, the girls soccer team — the Lady Lions — won the Midsouth Association of Independent Schools championship. They became runner up in 2022.

In 2021, the Girls Tennis won the Midsouth Association of Independent Schools championship.

Embezzlement
In 2015, the former headmaster pleaded guilty to embezzling from the school between 2011 and 2013.

References

External links
Laurel Christian School website

Christian schools in Mississippi
Classical Christian schools
Private K-12 schools in Mississippi
Schools in Jones County, Mississippi
Nondenominational Christian schools in the United States
Preparatory schools in Mississippi